Yurkovo is a rural locality (a village) in Krasnoselskoye Rural Settlement, Yuryev-Polsky District, Vladimir Oblast, Russia. The population was 97 as of 2010.

Geography 
Yurkovo is located 17 km northeast of Yuryev-Polsky (the district's administrative centre) by road. Entuziast is the nearest rural locality.

References 

Rural localities in Yuryev-Polsky District